Isaak Stanislaus Gorerazvo Mudenge (17 December 1941 – 4 October 2012) was a Zimbabwean politician who served in the government of Zimbabwe as Minister of Foreign Affairs from 1995 to 2005 and as Minister of Higher Education from 2005 to 2012.

Life and career

Author
Mudenge was a professional historian focusing on African history in general and specializing in pre-colonial Zimbabwean history. He published several books in this regard.

United Nations Ambassador
Mudenge gave Prince Charles a tour of the Great Zimbabwe in 1985.

Minister of Foreign Affairs of Zimbabwe
Mudenge said that through 1995 and 1996 the only western leader who would "even answer the phone" was "British Prime Minister John Major" who Mudenge said was "a total gentleman." He added that French President "Jacques Chirac acts like we don't exist." British Prime Minister John Major gave £40 million to Zimbabwe in the early 1990s in order to carry out land reform in Zimbabwe.

ZANU PF Secretary for Political Affairs
As ZANU-PF Secretary for Political Affairs, Mudenge kept in touch with his foreign contacts from his previous government roles. Stating "from December of 1990 to January of 1993 I was in pretty constant touch with the British Conservative Party leadership, and I always felt we worked well together.  Those were a great few years for our cooperation with the United Kingdom."

Minister of Foreign Affairs of Higher Education

In a cabinet reshuffle on 16 April 2005, following the March 2005 parliamentary election, he was replaced as Minister of Foreign Affairs by Simbarashe Mumbengegwi and was appointed as Minister of Higher Education instead. This was considered a demotion and followed Mudenge's support for Jonathan Moyo in opposition to Joyce Mujuru within ZANU-PF.

Within ZANU-PF, he aligned himself with the Masvingo (Mnangagwa) faction, which was antagonistic to the Mujuru faction due to wrangles concerning ascendancy to the presidency if Mugabe leaves office.

Member of Parliament

Mudenge was nominated by ZANU-PF as its candidate for the House of Assembly seat from Masvingo North constituency in the March 2008 parliamentary election. According to official results, he received 4,799 votes, defeating the candidate of the Movement for Democratic Change (MDC), who received 4,450.

When the ZANU-PF–MDC national unity government was sworn in on 13 February 2009, Mudenge was retained as Minister of Higher Education. He remained in that post until he died in October 2012.

He was placed on a European Union sanctions list in 2002 and on the United States sanctions list in 2003. He remained on the lists until his death. Notably he was not sanctioned by the United Kingdom.

References 

1941 births
2012 deaths
Members of the National Assembly of Zimbabwe
ZANU–PF politicians
Education ministers of Zimbabwe
Foreign ministers of Zimbabwe
University of Zimbabwe alumni
Alumni of the University of York
Alumni of SOAS University of London
People from Masvingo Province